Haplogroup HV is a human mitochondrial DNA (mtDNA) haplogroup.

Origin
Haplogroup HV derives from the haplogroup R0, which in turn descends from haplogroup R. HV is also the ancestral clade to the haplogroups H and V.  A possible origin of HV haplogroup is in the region of Western Iran, Mesopotamia, and the South Caucasus, where the highest prevalence of HV has been found.

Distribution
Haplogroup HV is found mainly in Western Asia, Central Asia, Southern Europe, Eastern Europe, and North Africa.

In Africa, the clade peaks among Egyptians inhabiting El-Hayez oasis (14.3%). with the HV0 subclade occurring among Mozabite Berbers (8.24%), Libyans (7.4%), Reguibate Sahrawi (6.48%), Zenata Berbers (5.48%), and Algerians (4.84% total; 2.15%-3.75% in Oran).

In a study published in 2013, haplogroup HV(xHV0, H) was found in great percentages of populations in Afghanistan: 11.0% (14/127) Uzbek (including 1/127 HV2 and 1/127 HV6), 8.2% (12/146) Tajik (including 3/146 HV6 and 1/146 HV2), 8.0% (6/75) Turkmen (including 1/75 HV2), 6.4% (5/78) Hazara, and 5.6% (5/90) Pashtun. Furthermore, haplogroup HV0 was found in 1.4% (2/146) of the sample of Afghanistani Tajiks, but it is unclear whether these belong to the haplogroup V subclade. The subclade HV1a1a has been found in 1.8% (3/169) of Yakuts in one study and 1.2% (5/423) of Yakuts in another study published in 2013.

A 2003 study was published reporting on the mtDNA sequencing of the bones of two 24,000-year-old anatomically modern humans of the Cro-Magnon type from southern Italy. The study showed one was of either haplogroup HV or R0. Haplogroup HV has also been found among ancient Egyptian mummies excavated at the Abusir el-Meleq archaeological site in Middle Egypt, which date from the Pre-Ptolemaic/late New Kingdom, Ptolemaic, and Roman periods.

Haplogroup HV has been found in various fossils that were analysed for ancient DNA, including specimens associated with the Alföld Linear Pottery (HV, Mezőkövesd-Mocsolyás, 1/3 or 33%), Linearbandkeramik (HV0a, Fajsz-Garadomb, 1/2 or 50%), and Germany Middle Neolithic (HV, Quedlinburg, 1/2 or 50%) cultures.

Subclades

Tree
This phylogenetic tree of haplogroup HV subclades is based on the paper by van Oven (2009) and Malyarchuk et al. (2008).

HV
HV0 (formerly known as pre-V)
HV0a (formerly known as preV*2)
HV0a1
V
195 (formerly known as preV*1)
HV0b
HV0c
HV1
HV1a
HV1a1
HV1a1a
HV1a2
HV1b
HV1b1
HV1b2
HV1c
73
HV2
HV2a
HV4
HV4a
HV5
16311 (formerly known as HV3)  (13±2 kya)
HV6 (formerly known as HV3b) (15.4±4.5 kya)
HV6a (formerly known as HV3b1)
HV7 (formerly known as HV3c)
HV8 (formerly known as HV3d)
HV9 (formerly known as HV3a) (8.2±2.9 kya)
152
HV9a
HV10
H

HV0 and HVSI C16298T
Defining mutation C/T at location 16298 in segment I one of the hypervariable segment is labeled as HV0 as of 2012. The percentage of people that tested positive for the above mutation in a study of western European populations in 2002 is given below.

In a study of Russian and Polish populations the percentage of people who tested positive for this mutation was five percent for both populations.

A study of Iraqis summarized a number of previous studies showing low levels of this mutation amongst Middle Eastern and Italian populations.

This mutation has been detected in ancient DNA obtained from one of nineteen human remains excavated on the island of Gotland, Sweden, dated to 2,800-2,000 BC and archaeologically classified as belonging to the Pitted Ware culture.

See also

Genealogical DNA test
Genetic genealogy
Population genetics

References

External links 
General
Ian Logan's Mitochondrial DNA Site
Mannis van Oven's Phylotree
Haplogroup HV
Spread of Haplogroup HV, from the Genographic Project
The India Genealogical DNA Project at Family Tree DNA
mtDNA Haplogroup HV Project at Family Tree DNA

HV